Hemmatabad (also Romanized as Hemmatābād; also known as Khvājeh) is a village in Petergan Rural District, Central District, Zirkuh County, South Khorasan Province, Iran. At the 2006 census, its population was 220, in 58 families.

References 

Populated places in Zirkuh County